Sholgara is a village in Sholgara District, Balkh Province, Afghanistan. Pashtuns are the primary ethnic group in the district followed by Arabs, Tajiks, and Hazaras.

See also 
Balkh Province

Populated places in Balkh Province